Hartmut Faust (born 16 May 1965) is a West German sprint canoer who competed during the 1980s. He won a bronze medal in the C-2 1000 m event at the 1986 ICF Canoe Sprint World Championships in Montreal.

Faust also competed in two Summer Olympics, earning his best finish of fifth in the C-2 1000 m event at the 1988 Summer Olympics in Seoul.

References

Sports-reference.com profile

1965 births
Canoeists at the 1984 Summer Olympics
Canoeists at the 1988 Summer Olympics
German male canoeists
Living people
Olympic canoeists of West Germany
ICF Canoe Sprint World Championships medalists in Canadian